Ferenc Tima (14 December 1919 – 7 December 1976) was a Hungarian sprinter. He competed in the men's 4 × 100 metres relay at the 1948 Summer Olympics.

References

1919 births
1976 deaths
Athletes (track and field) at the 1948 Summer Olympics
Hungarian male sprinters
Olympic athletes of Hungary
Place of birth missing